Per Tommy Jansson (2 October 1952 – 20 May 1976) was a motorcycle speedway rider. He was one of Sweden's most exciting speedway prospects in the 1970s but was killed in the Swedish Final a World Championship Qualifying Round meeting.

He was the son of former Swedish International speedway rider Joel Jansson. His brother Bo (Bosse) Jansson was also a speedway rider.

Speedway career
Jansson initially appeared in the UK on 23 July 1970 while touring with the Young Sweden team in a British League Division Two test series against Young England.  He rode at Teesside, scoring 10 points. He was injured in the second test match, at Workington, the following night, and he returned to Sweden.

He came to England in 1971 to ride for the Wembley Lions making his debut on 9 April, in an away match against Wolverhampton, where he scored 6 points. But his stay with the Lions only lasted for three British League Division One matches. Although he did continue to race in the UK for the Young Sweden touring team, against Young England in a British League Division Two test series. He never rode a home match at Wembley for the Lions, because at this time their home matches were taking place at Newport, in Wales.

In 1972 he made his debut for the Wimbledon Dons on 15 June, at home to Wolverhampton, scoring 10 points. He later returned to Sweden to complete his National Service during the 1973 British League season, after competing in several league matches.

In 1974 when all Swedish based riders were banned from riding in the British League, he only rode in open meetings: at Wimbledon, and in an International Test Match series against England. He also became the champion of Sweden by wining the 1974 Speedway Swedish Individual Championship.

His last appearance at Plough Lane (Wimbledon's home) was on Thursday, 13 May 1976, in a Marlboro Southern Riders Championship qualifying round (which he was the reigning Champion). He won this meeting with a 15-point maximum. Prior to this meeting he beat Dave Jessup (Reading) 2-1 (after suffering a first race engine failure) to retain his Golden Helmet British Match Race Championship. Jansson's last meeting in the UK was at Halifax, in a British League Division One match, on Saturday, 15 May>  He scored 12 points from five rides.

In Sweden he rode for Smederna.

At the time of his death, aged only twenty-three, he had already appeared in four World finals. He also won the World Pairs Championship with Anders Michanek in 1973 and 1975. 

Jansson also rode in four speedway World Team Cup Finals for Sweden: in 1972, 1973, 1974, and 1975.

He was the last rider to hold the British Speedway Golden Helmet. The original Golden Helmet was given to his family after his death.

World final appearances

Individual World Championship
 1971 -  Göteborg, Ullevi - 14th - 1pt
 1973 -  Chorzów, Silesian Stadium - Reserve - 0pts
 1974 -  Göteborg, Ullevi - Reserve - 3pts
 1975 -  London, Wembley Stadium - 9th - 7pts

World Pairs Championship
 1973 -  Borås (with Anders Michanek) - Winner - 24pts (9)
 1975 -  Wrocław, Olympic Stadium (with Anders Michanek) - Winner - 24pts (7)

World Team Cup
 1972 -  Olching, Olching Speedwaybahn (with Jan Simensen / Anders Michanek / Christer Lofqvist / Göte Nordin) 4th - 18pts (4)
 1973 -  London, Wembley Stadium (with Anders Michanek / Bernt Persson / Bengt Jansson) - 2nd - 31pts (5)
 1974 -  Chorzów, Silesian Stadium (with Anders Michanek / Sören Sjösten / Christer Lofqvist) - 2nd - 31pts (7)
 1975 -  Norden, Motodrom Halbemond (with Anders Michanek / Bernt Persson / Sören Sjösten / Sören Karlsson) - 3rd - 17pts (4)

References

1952 births
1976 deaths
Swedish speedway riders
Motorcycle racers who died while racing
Speedway World Pairs Champions
Wimbledon Dons riders
Wembley Lions riders
People from Eskilstuna
Sportspeople from Södermanland County